Roger Federer was the defending champion, but chose not to participate that year.

Radek Štěpánek won in the final 6–0, 6–3, against Christophe Rochus.

Seeds

  Rafael Nadal (withdrew due to a leg injury)
  Nikolay Davydenko (semifinals)
  David Ferrer (second round)
  Thomas Johansson (first round)
  Mario Ančić (first round)
  Radek Štěpánek (champion)
  Sébastien Grosjean (withdrew due to personal reasons)
  Tomáš Berdych (first round)
  Igor Andreev (first round)

Draw

Finals

Top half

Bottom half

External links
 Main Draw
 Qualifying draw

Singles
2006 ATP Tour